Jordy Paul Douglas (born January 20, 1958) is a Canadian former professional ice hockey left winger who played 268 games in the National Hockey League and 51 games in the World Hockey Association.  He played for the Hartford Whalers, Minnesota North Stars, and Winnipeg Jets.

Career statistics

Regular season and playoffs

Awards and achievements
Honoured Member of the Manitoba Hockey Hall of Fame

External links

Profile at hockeydraftcentral.com

1958 births
Living people
Binghamton Whalers players
Canadian ice hockey left wingers
Flin Flon Bombers players
Hartford Whalers players
Ilves players
Minnesota North Stars players
New England Whalers players
Sherbrooke Canadiens players
Springfield Indians players
Ice hockey people from Winnipeg
Toronto Maple Leafs draft picks
Winnipeg Jets (1979–1996) players